Illawarra Highway is a short state highway in New South Wales, Australia. It connects Wollongong to the Southern Highlands and links Princes Highway and Hume Highway. It is named after the geographical area it crosses, the Illawarra region.

Route
Illawarra Highway commences at the interchange with Hume Highway at Hoddles Cross Roads west of Sutton Forest and heads in a northeasterly direction as a two-lane, single-carriageway road until it reaches Moss Vale, after which it heads in an easterly direction through Robertson until it reaches the Macquarie Pass, where the road twists through hairpin curves as it descends the Illawarra escarpment through Macquarie Pass National Park and crosses the Macquarie Valley to the coastal region around Shellharbour. After passing through Tongarra, the highway eventually terminates at the interchange with Princes Motorway in Albion Park.

The Macquarie Pass, with many hairpin bends and steep gradients, is unsuitable for large and articulated vehicles: trucks are instead advised to use the Mount Ousley Road (route B88), also known as Picton Road. 

Both Robertson and Moss Vale are country towns with 19th-century buildings still intact, and Macquarie Pass has one of the southernmost stands of Australia's sub tropical rainforest.

History
The passing of the Main Roads Act of 1924 through the Parliament of New South Wales provided for the declaration of Main Roads, roads partially funded by the State government through the Main Roads Board (later the Department of Main Roads, and eventually Transport for NSW). Main Road No. 260 was declared from the intersection with Hume Highway at the Cross Roads (today Hoddles Cross Roads) west of Sutton Forest to Moss Vale (and continuing north via Bowral to the intersection with Hume Highway at Mittagong), and Main Road No. 262 was declared from Moss Vale via Robertson and Macquarie Pass to the intersection with Princes Highway at Albion Park, on the same day, 8 August 1928.

The Department of Main Roads, which had succeeded the New South Wales MRB in 1932, declared Trunk Road 88 on 28 March 1951, from Cross Roads via Moss Vale and Robertson to the intersection with Princes Highway 1 mile north of Albion Park railway station; the southern end of Main Road 260 was truncated to meet Trunk Road 88 at Moss Vale, and Main Road 262 was reduced to a 2.5km stretch between Albion Park and Albion Park railway station. This was replaced with the declaration of State Highway 25 along the same route on 4 July 1962, subsuming Trunk Road 88. State Highway 25 was named Illawarra Highway on 22 February 1967.

The passing of the Roads Act of 1993 through the Parliament of New South Wales updated road classifications and the way they could be declared within New South Wales. Under this act, Illawarra Highway today retains its declaration as Highway 25, from Hoddles Cross Roads to Albion Park.

The route was allocated National Route 48 in 1974. With the conversion to the newer alphanumeric system in 2013, this was replaced with route A48.

Major intersections

See also

 Highways in Australia
 List of highways in New South Wales

References

Highways in New South Wales
Wollongong